Punikve  is a village in Croatia.

Geography 
Punikve is around 2,12 km² big

Residents
According to the Croatian population census from 2021 there is 418 residents in Punikve

History
 Stjepan Vuković (archaeologist)

Notes

References

Populated places in Varaždin County